The 7th Medical Command provided Echelon/Role 4 Health Service Support to units of the United States Army Europe. It was a Table of organization and equipment organization that replaced the United States Army Medical Command, Europe, a Table of distribution and allowances-based organization that had provided both Role 3 and Role 4 Health Service Support from 1970 to 1978. Upon the inactivation of the 7th Medical Command in 1994, the Role 4 mission was assumed by the United States Army Medical Command through its European Health Service Support Area, while the remaining Role 3 mission was assumed by the 30th Medical Brigade.

Lineage

Constituted 21 September 1978 in the regular Army as Headquarters and Headquarters Company, 7th Medical Command and activated in Germany
Inactivated 15 October 1994 in Germany

Honors

Campaign participation credit

None

Decorations

None

History

With its activation on 21 September 1978, the 7th Medical Command became the first unit of its type in the US Army. It would be joined by the 18th Medical Command on 16 August 1984, the 3d Medical Command on 16 September 1990, and the 807th Medical Command on 17 September 2002.

The basic mission of the 7th Medical Command was to be prepared to provide medical support to US Army Forces in the European Theater in the
event of war and to provide peacetime health care services within the theater. The significance of the 7th Medical Command designation was that this wartime mission was being recognized as an on-going task, and the necessary equipment and personnel for the combat role were identified. Thus, the reorganization under the 7th Medical Command banner had a direct effect on the unit's readiness for combat. The predecessor organization of the 7th Medical Command—the US Army Medical Command, Europe (USAMEDCOMEUR)—did not have the necessary equipment and personnel authorized for a combat mission, although many of the subordinate units and activities remained the same.

The USAMEDCOMEUR was activated in Heidelberg, Federal Republic of Germany, on 1 July 1968 as part of the Command, Control and Logistics
System 1970. Initially assigned to USAMEDCOMEUR were the 9th Hospital Center, its hospitals, dispensaries and activities; the US Army Veterinary Detachment, Europe; the 8th Finance Disbursing Section; the 10th Medical Laboratory; the 26th Medical Detachment (Illustration);
the USAREUR Medical Regulating Office; the 655th Medical Company (Blood Bank); the USAREUR Preventive Medicine Detachment; the 8000th Civilian Labor Group; and the Benelux (SHAPE) Medical Service Area.

On 1 October 1968, the 7th Medical Brigade with its major units—the 30th and 31st Medical Groups and the 421st Medical Company (Air Ambulance)—was added to the Command. On that same date, the Medical Depot at Einsiedlerhof and the medical section of the Supply and Maintenance Agency were formed into the US Army Medical Materiel Center, Europe, marking the first time that all medical logistics functions in Europe were under the control of the USAREUR Chief Surgeon.

On 1 January 1969, the medical facilities in Berlin and those in Italy were assigned to USAMEDCOMEUR. The 9th Hospital Center was phased
down in December 1970, and hospitals in that command became Medical Department Activities (MEDDACs) reporting directly to USAMEDCOMEUR.
In March 1971, USAMEDCOMEUR became subordinate to the Theater Army Support Command (TASCOM), while the Office of the Chief Surgeon
remained an integral part of Headquarters, USAREUR. On 21 July 1973, the 7th Medical Brigade was inactivated and the 30th and 31st Medical
Groups, the 421st Medical Company and all other units subordinate to the 7th Medical Brigade were assigned directly to USAMEDCOMEUR.

On 1 July 1973, USAMEDCOMEUR was relieved from assignment to TASCOM and became a major subordinate command of USAREUR. On 1 July 1974,
the Teheran MEDDAC was activated and assumed responsibility for Army medical support in the Middle East area. On 1 April 1975, the
31st Medical Group was inactivated, placing all combat support hospitals and other field medical units under the 30th Medical
Group.

On 21 October 1978, in another major move to improve combat readiness, another medical group—the 68th Medical Group—was reactivated and certain medical units previously assigned to USAMEDCOMEUR (such as ground ambulance companies and combat support hospitals) came under the command & control of the V and VII Corps. The 68th Medical Group assumed command of units providing V Corps Role III support, and the 30th Medical Group assumed command of units providing VII Corps Role III support. The 421st Medical Company(Air Ambulance) remained under the control of the 7th Medical Command and continued to provide air ambulance service throughout the theater.

After the completion of the actions in October 1978, the 7th Medical Command controlled all fixed medical and dental activities throughout the
European Theater, provided medical care services to members of the US Forces and their dependents, and maintained a readiness for
combat.

Shoulder Sleeve Insignia

Description
A heptagonal device 2 1/2 inches (6.35 cm) in diameter, with one angle at top center, consisting of a maroon cross humetty on a white background bearing a yellow fleam, all within a 1/8 inch (.32 cm) maroon border.

Symbolism 
The colors maroon and white, in conjunction with the cross, are indicative of the unit's medical mission. The fleam is a heraldic symbol for a surgical lancet and its form simulates the unit's numerical designation, which is repeated in the shape of the device.

Background 
The shoulder sleeve insignia was approved on 19 October 1978. (TIOH Drawing Number A-1-626)

Distinctive Unit Insignia

Description
A silver color metal and enamel device 1 3/16 inches (3.02 cm) in height overall consisting of a seven-pointed silver star, one point up, bearing in center a maroon fleam and interwoven through the points of the star a circular maroon scroll inscribed in base "THE SEVENTH SERVES" in silver letters.

Symbolism 
The colors maroon and white are traditional to the Medical Corps. The fleam is a heraldic symbol for a surgical lancet and its form simulates the unit's numerical designation; the star alludes to the command position of the unit.

Background 
The distinctive unit insignia was approved on 4 December 1978.

Combat Service Identification Badge
No Combat Service Identification Badge was authorized for the 7th Medical Command by the United States Army Institute of Heraldry.

Commanders
All commanders of the 7th Medical Command were Medical Corps officers.

Deputy Commanders
All deputy commanders of the 7th Medical Command were Dental Corps officers, and also served as the U.S. Army Europe Chief Dental Surgeon.

References

United States Army
Medical units and formations of the United States Army